710 ESPN may refer to:

KSPN (AM), licensed to Los Angeles, California, United States
KIRO (AM), licensed to Seattle, Washington, United States